Vladimir Arturovich Kniller (born 8 July 1964 in Alma-Ata) is a Russian football coach and a former player.

Kniller made a single appearance in the Russian Premier League with FC Dynamo-Gazovik Tyumen.

References

1964 births
Sportspeople from Almaty
Living people
Soviet footballers
Russian footballers
FC Tobol Kurgan players
FC Tyumen players
FC Tobol Kurgan managers
Russian Premier League players
Russian football managers
Association football defenders